The Full Gospel Church, also known as Grace Presbyterian Church, is a historic church building in Asotin, Washington. It was built in 1899, and was added to the National Register of Historic Places in 1972.

References

Presbyterian churches in Washington (state)
Churches on the National Register of Historic Places in Washington (state)
Gothic Revival church buildings in Washington (state)
Churches completed in 1899
Buildings and structures in Asotin County, Washington
National Register of Historic Places in Asotin County, Washington